Graphium incerta is a butterfly found in China that belongs to the swallowtail family.

Taxonomy
Originally described as a subspecies of Graphium tamerlana and later treated as conspecific with G. tamerlana. Studies of the genitalia by Chou and Koiwaya suggested it is a full species.

References

Chou, I. (ed) 1994. Monographia Rhopalocerorum Sinensium (Monograph of Chinese Butterflies) [in Chinese]. Henan Scientific and Technological Publishing House, [Zhengzhou]; 2 vols., viii, 855 pp.
Koiwaya, S. 1993. Descriptions of Three New Genera, Eleven New Species and Seven new Subspecies of Butterflies from China. Studies of Chinese Butterflies, 2: 43-111.

External links
Butterfly Corner Images from Naturhistorisches Museum Wien

Butterflies described in 1927
Butterflies of Asia
Insects of China
Taxa named by Otto Bang-Haas